The seal of the Territory of Idaho was adopted in 1863 and redrawn several times before statehood in 1890. The state Great Seal was designed by Emma Edwards Green, the only woman to design a U.S. state seal.

The flag of the State of Idaho was adopted on March 15, 1927, and consists of the state seal on a field of blue. The words "State of Idaho" appear in gold letters on a red and gold band below the seal. According to the official description of the flag, there should also be a fringe of gold around the edges.

The seal depicts a miner and a woman representing equality, liberty and justice. The symbols on the seal represent some of Idaho's natural resources: mines, forests, farmland and wildlife.

The current seal contains the text "Great Seal of the State of Idaho" in the outer ring, with the star that signifies a new light in the galaxy of states. The inner ring contains a banner with the Latin motto, Esto perpetua ("Let it be perpetual" or "It is forever"). A woman (signifying justice) and a man (dressed as a miner) support a shield. The miner represents the chief industry of the state at the time of statehood.

Inside, the shield bears images symbolic of the state. The pine tree in the foreground refers to Idaho's immense timber interests. The husbandman plowing on the left side of the shield, together with the sheaf of grain beneath the shield, are emblematic of Idaho's agricultural resources, while the two cornucopias, or horns of plenty, refer to the horticultural. Idaho has a game law, which protects the elk and moose; an elk's head rises above the shield. The state flower, the wild syringa or mock orange, grows tall at the woman's right, while the ripened wheat grows as high as her shoulder. The river depicted in the shield is the Snake or Shoshone River.

In 2001, the North American Vexillological Association surveyed its members on the designs of all 72 Canadian provincial, U.S. state and U.S. territorial flags, combined. Idaho finished in the bottom ten, finishing 64th out of the 72.

Historical seals

Government seals of Idaho

References

External links
The Great Seal of the State of Idaho

Symbols of Idaho
Idaho
Idaho
Idaho
Idaho
Idaho
Idaho
Idaho
Idaho
Idaho
Idaho
Idaho
Idaho
Idaho
Idaho